Göta Elisabeth Pettersson (18 December 1926 – 9 October 1993) was a Swedish gymnast. She was part of the Swedish teams that finished fourth all-around at the 1948 and 1952 Olympics and won a gold medal in the team portable apparatus in 1952. She also won a gold all-around team medal at the 1950 World Artistic Gymnastics Championships.

References

Further reading

External links
 

1926 births
1993 deaths
Swedish female artistic gymnasts
Gymnasts at the 1948 Summer Olympics
Gymnasts at the 1952 Summer Olympics
Olympic gymnasts of Sweden
Olympic gold medalists for Sweden
Olympic medalists in gymnastics
Medalists at the 1952 Summer Olympics
Medalists at the World Artistic Gymnastics Championships
Sportspeople from Stockholm
20th-century Swedish women